"Animals" is an episode of the British comedy television series The Goodies.

This episode is also known as "Animal Liberation" and "Animal Lib" and also "Watership Down".

Written by The Goodies, with songs and music by Bill Oddie.

Plot
Tim has been collecting various animals to take part in showbiz. However, his agency is not a commercial success due to his pathetic ways of training animals and Bill is crazed by hunger for meat which he has not eaten while feeding the animals. Graeme arrives to collect lions for the circus but Tim has no big cats or bears for cruel taming. So, Bill and Graeme came up other ideas and put the animals to work in energy-saving domestic duties.  Tim is horrified at what they have done, so he decides to support an "Animal Discrimination Act": Animals are granted equal rights with humans and it is now illegal for humans to exploit animals.

This includes a ban on eating animals, which enrages carnivorous Bill, who decides to "speak out" for vegetables in the "Rabid Frost Programme", where he ends up eating the leader of the Animal Revolutionary Party and making animals angry for seeing the true meaning of human nature. In the end, the humans have to disguise themselves as rabbits to escape from the fury of the animals.

Cultural references
 David Attenborough
 David Bellamy
 David Frost
 Reginald Bosanquet
 News at Ten
 Not the Nine O'Clock News
 Watership Down

References

 "The Complete Goodies" — Robert Ross, B T Batsford, London, 2000
 "The Goodies Rule OK" — Robert Ross, Carlton Books Ltd, Sydney, 2006
 "From Fringe to Flying Circus — 'Celebrating a Unique Generation of Comedy 1960-1980'" — Roger Wilmut, Eyre Methuen Ltd, 1980
 "The Goodies Episode Summaries" — Brett Allender
 "The Goodies — Fact File" — Matthew K. Sharp
 "TV Heaven" — Jim Sangster & Paul Condon, HarperCollinsPublishers, London, 2005

External links
 

The Goodies (series 8) episodes
1980 British television episodes